J-Bus (Jei-Basu Kabushiki-gaisha, J・バス株式会社) is a Japanese manufacturer of buses and coaches. It is a joint venture of Isuzu and Hino Motors. The company was formed by merging the bus manufacturing divisions of Isuzu and Hino, maintaining the two plants used by those companies.

References

Bus manufacturers of Japan